Greeicy Yeliana Rendón Ceballos (born 30 October 1992), known mononymously as Greeicy, is a Colombian actress and singer.

Early life and career 
She remained in Cali for the first five years of her childhood, until her parents, Luis Alberto Rendón and Lucy Ceballos, decided to move to Bogota. Since she was a child, she has had an interest in interpretation and music, and took classes in acting, piano, flute, guitar and singing.

Her first onscreen appearance was in the 2007 edition of the reality show for talent children's Factor Xs, being sponsored by the singer and composer José Gaviria, and although she did not win, her appearance in that program gave her the opportunity to be included in a casting, which meant entering the world of acting. Her first role as an actress was in 2009 in the telenovela, Cuando salga el sol as Carolina Parra, the daughter of the main couple. The following year, she was chosen by Sergio Cabrera to play Sierva in the telenovela La Pola.

In January 2011, she played Flor Porras in Correo de inocentes. Months later, she joined the cast of ¿Dónde está Elisa?, playing Marcela. adaptation of a homonymous Chilean telenovela of 2009.

In 2013, she played Johanna Barrera, in La prepago. Later, she was chosen by the producers of RCN Televisión and TeleVideo as the protagonist of Chica vampiro. The series premiered on 14 May 2013. Although it did not have a good reception in Colombia, instead it was a success in Italy and France.

In 2014, she was announced as the youth protagonist of the telenovela La ronca de oro, based on the life of the Colombian singer, Helenita Vargas. Also she was part of the Colombian version of The Wonderful Years, in Spanish titled Los años maravillosos. In 2015, she starred in Tiro de gracia. Then she was part of Esmeraldas, where she played Paula Guáqueta Guerrero.

In 2016, she was in Las Vega's, a Colombian adaptation of the Chilean series of the same name and was announced as one of the protagonists of the adaptation of the American series Revenge. RCN Televisión decided to postpone the premiere for 2017. The program finally debuted on 2 March 2017 in Argentina, on Channel El Trece and on 6 March in Colombia, with the title of Venganza.

Personal life 
On 23 December 2021, Greeicy and Mike Bahia announced through a collaboration called “Att: Amor” that the couple was expecting their first baby together.

Filmography

Discography

Studio albums

As lead artist

As featured artist

Awards

References

External links 
 
 

21st-century Colombian women singers
Colombian telenovela actresses
Living people
1992 births
Women in Latin music
Universal Music Latin Entertainment artists